Voriella is a genus of parasitic flies in the family Tachinidae. There are at least three described species in Voriella.

Species
These three species belong to the genus Voriella:
 Voriella inconspicua (Malloch, 1930)
 Voriella setiventris Malloch, 1935
 Voriella uniseta Malloch, 1930

References

Further reading

 
 
 
 

Tachinidae
Articles created by Qbugbot